Josué Kossingou Balamandji (born 9 August 1989 in Bangui) is a Central African footballer who currently plays for Mulhouse. He plays as either a striker or a winger.

Career

Club career 
Balamandji was born in Bangui and moved to France at two months old. After rotating between both countries in his youth, at the age of eight, his family moved permanently to France settling in Paris. Balamandji began his career with Red Star before joining professional club Lens at the age of 15. Following the 2006–07 season, he was released from the club and, subsequently, signed with Lorient. With Lorient, Balamandji played on the club's reserve team. After two years with Lorient, he signed with Plabennec in the Championnat National. Balamandji only made one appearance with the team in the 2009–10 season.

Prior to the 2010–11 season, Balamandji joined amateur club Villemomble in the Championnat de France amateur, the fourth level of French football. The forward had a successful campaign appearing in 20 matches and scoring 11 goals, which included a double against his former club Red Star. On 24 May 2011, it was announced that Balamandji had signed his first professional contract agreeing to a two-year deal with Reims. He made his professional debut on 30 July 2011 appearing as a substitute in a 2–0 win over his former club Lens.

Career statistics

Club 

(Correct as of 28 November 2011)

Notes

References

External links 
 
 

Living people
1989 births
People from Bangui
Central African Republic footballers
Central African Republic international footballers
Naturalized citizens of France
French footballers
French sportspeople of Central African Republic descent
PFC Chernomorets Burgas players
Expatriate footballers in France
Expatriate footballers in Bulgaria
Ligue 2 players
First Professional Football League (Bulgaria) players
Association football wingers
Association football forwards
Central African Republic emigrants to France
Central African Republic expatriate sportspeople in Bulgaria
Stade Plabennécois players